The West Clare Railway (WCR) originally operated in County Clare, Ireland, between 1887 and 1961. This  narrow-gauge railway ran from the county town of Ennis, via numerous stopping-points along the West Clare coast to two termini, at Kilrush and Kilkee, with the routes diverging at Moyasta Junction. The system was the last operating narrow gauge passenger system in Ireland and connected with the mainline rail system at Ennis, where a station still stands today for bus and train services to Limerick and Galway. Intermediate stops included Ennistymon, Lahinch and Milltown Malbay.

A preservation society maintains a railway museum at Moyasta Junction station, and successfully re-opened a section of the railway as a passenger-carrying heritage line with diesel traction in the 1990s, and with steam motive power from 2009.

The Railway was notorious for poor timekeeping, resulting in litigation and a celebrated comic song.

Construction
The Famine was over and there was a new growth in local businesses. The British Government determined that an improved railway system was necessary to aid in the recovery of the West of Ireland. The West Clare Railway and the South Clare Railway were built by separate companies, but in practice, the West Clare Railway operated the entire line. The lines met at Milltown Malbay. In due course, the entire line became known as the West Clare Railway.

West Clare Railway
The  West Clare Railway between Ennis and Milltown Malbay was built a few years earlier than the South Clare Railway. The first sod was cut on 26 January 1885 at Milltown Malbay by Charles Stewart Parnell, M.P., although actual work on the line had begun in November 1884.

In late February 1887, the Athenry and Ennis Railway (A&E) filed an injunction to prevent the West Clare Railway from accessing lands it had built on that the A&E had previously claimed but not yet constructed on for itself.  The case went to arbitration in March 1887. The West Clare Railway initially agreed to pay £51 annually for the right to build on the land, then in a second agreement reached on 27 June 1888, the West Clare Railway was ordered to pay rent at £60 annually to the A&E (which later became part of the Waterford, Limerick and Western Railway) for use of the land.

The line was opened on 2 July 1887. The notes for construction of the line were closed in December 1887.

South Clare Railway
The South Clare Railway built the extension from Milltown Malbay to Kilrush, Cappagh Pier (Kilrush Pier) and Kilrush docks with a branch to Kilkee from Moyasta. The line was proposed in 1889, with work starting on the extension in October 1890 and opening on 11 May 1892. The extension was worked by the West Clare Railway and was initially dogged by poor service and time keeping, but this later improved.  Some of the service irregularity was attributed, in a report given at the railway's annual meeting in 1894, to a requirement set by the Board of Trade to run separate passenger and goods trains rather than mixed trains.

Operation and timekeeping
The West Clare Railway was the topic of Percy French's song "Are Ye Right There Michael, are ye right?" (written in 1902), deriding the poor timekeeping and poor track quality of the time. Though amusing, some complained that this jesting nevertheless did little to further the cause for keeping the line open. French wrote the song after successfully suing the railway company for loss of earnings, when a late-running train prevented him from attending a performance on time. The company, in turn, appealed the ruling, but French was over an hour late for the court hearing in Ennis. He informed the judge that his lateness was because "I took the West Clare Railway here, your honour". The railway company's appeal was unsuccessful.

Many myths have arisen concerning the Percy French incident. The facts are that French had arrived in Kilkee four-and-a-half hours after the scheduled time for a show he was due to give at Moore's Hall on 10 August 1896. He had been due there at 3:25 pm, having begun his journey at Broadstone Terminus in Dublin that morning. The show was late starting as a result, and with a much-reduced audience. French won his case at the Ennis Quarter Sessions in January 1897, and was awarded £10 plus expenses. The Clare Journal's headline for the court hearing was, 'An Hour With Percy French "free of charge"'. The case has since been re-enacted by the Corofin Dramatic Society at Ennis Courthouse. His award was subsequently upheld in a reserved judgment when the railway company appealed the case two months later at the Clare Spring Assizes, before the Rt. Hon. Chief Baron Christopher Palles, by which time French had the germ of a song in his head: the line, 'If you want to get to Kilkee, you must go there by the sea' was repeated in court although it failed to make it in the song's final version. The Railway had a disastrous policy of defending litigation. In another case heard on the same day as the Percy French case, Mrs. Mary Ann Butler, from Limerick sued the Railway successfully when she was struck by a donkey on the Railway platform in Ennis.

Amalgamation and nationalisation
In 1925, the company was merged into the Great Southern Railways. In 1945 the GSR was taken over by Córas Iompair Éireann. In the same year, a survey of local businesses was conducted with a view to the possible replacement of the railway by road services.

Steam locomotives
The West Clare Railway operated a fleet of eighteen steam locomotives. Some historical confusion is caused by the reusing of fleet numbers (when locomotives were withdrawn, their numbers were reallocated). Each entry in the table below is a separate locomotive, even where fleet numbers are repeated.

Diesel locomotives and units

In the early 1950s, under CIÉ management, the West Clare Railway became a pioneer in the use of diesel traction. Passenger services were largely operated by four new articulated diesel railcars, built by Walker Brothers of Wigan, England (almost identical to units built for the County Donegal Railways). These were followed by three diesel locomotives (also built by Walkers). The use of diesel traction reduced operating costs, yet the investment in new rolling stock would largely be wasted by the early closure of the line.

Closure
Despite the dieselisation of passenger services in 1952 and freight in 1953 the system was still closed. On 27 September 1960, CIÉ gave notice of its intending closure with effect from 1 February 1961. CIÉ said that the West Clare was losing £23,000 (€1.2M 2006 equivalent) per year, despite the considerable traffic handled. In December it was announced that the line would close completely on 1 January 1961. Eventually, the line closed on 31 January 1961 with CIÉ starting work on dismantling the line the day after the closure on 1 February 1961.

By the time of its closure, the West Clare Railway was the last narrow-gauge railway in Ireland offering a passenger service; various lines operated by Bord na Móna continue to operate in connection with the peat industry.

Preservation and re-opening

Starting in the mid-1990s, efforts were made by a preservation society to recreate part of the original route. Passenger services were resumed using two new steel coaches with bench seating, parallel to the direction of travel, built by Alan Keef Engineering and outfitted locally in wood by WCR engineers. A small but powerful diesel locomotive built for Channel Tunnel construction work hauled the trains.

On 5 July 2009 the West Clare Railway's original steam locomotive No 5 Slieve Callan was returned to the West Clare Railway at Moyasta Junction following restoration in England by Alan Keef Engineering Ltd of Ross-on-Wye. This engine had previously been a static exhibit at the mainline railway station in Ennis. The locomotive was steamed for the first time on 14 July marking the return of steam to the West Clare railway after an absence of over 57 years.

The railway has since acquired a number of redundant diesel locomotives, mostly from the Irish Bord na Móna; these are being gradually restored and returned to service.

Current rolling stock
In addition to the steam locomotive Slieve Callan, the railway owns twelve diesel engines, of which two are currently in service, the others awaiting restoration. Those in service are a 4-wheel Channel Tunnel shunting engine and a four-wheel former Bord na Móna shunter. Awaiting restoration are a further nine such Bord na Móna shunters, plus a six-wheel mine shunting engine dating from around 1948.

Two passenger coaches are in service, and assorted maintenance vehicles including a tank wagon, four flat trucks, and four tipper wagons.

Irish standard gauge vehicles

In 2008, an Irish standard gauge ex-Irish Rail 001 class diesel loco, No.015 (formerly A15), was acquired for static display.

There are also three standard gauge passenger coaches on-site as static exhibits. One of these is used as a reception centre and cafeteria for visitors, and another as a lecture theatre for group visits.

The  gauge coaching stock located here consists of:
Great Southern Railways Side Corridor carriage No.1325.
Iarnród Éireann mkIIa carriages Nos.4108, 4110 and 4402 (restaurant).

A collection of mainline diesel locomotives owned by the Irish Traction Group has subsequently been located to the preserved railway (during 2009 and 2010) for storage, or as static exhibits. These locomotives include:
121 class locomotive No. 124
141 class locomotive No. 152

See also
 List of heritage railways in the Republic of Ireland
 History of rail transport in Ireland
 List of narrow-gauge railways in Ireland
 Worsley Works, who produces kits for those who model the West Clare Railway

References

External links
 

Heritage railways in the Republic of Ireland
Transport in County Clare
Closed railways in Ireland
3 ft gauge railways in Ireland
Tourist attractions in County Clare
Defunct railway companies of Ireland
Railway lines closed in 1961